Juan Zurano (born 1 September 1948) is a Spanish racing cyclist. He rode in the 1973 Tour de France.

References

External links
 

1948 births
Living people
Spanish male cyclists
People from Lorca, Spain
Cyclists from the Region of Murcia